In geometry, the elongated pentagonal gyrobirotunda is one of the Johnson solids. As the name suggests, it can be constructed by elongating a "pentagonal gyrobirotunda," or icosidodecahedron (one of the Archimedean solids), by inserting a decagonal prism between its congruent halves. Rotating one of the pentagonal rotundae through 36 degrees before inserting the prism yields an elongated pentagonal orthobirotunda .

Formulae
The following formulae for volume and surface area can be used if all faces are regular, with edge length a:

References

External links
 

Johnson solids